Jean-Jacques Nkouloukidi (born 15 April 1982 in Rome) is a former Italian race walker.

Biography
Born in Rome by Congolese father and Haitian mother grew up in Ostia practicing swimming and soccer. He participated at one edition of the Summer Olympics (2008), he has 7 caps in national team from 2005 to 2012.

Achievements

National titles
Ivano Brugnetti has won 3 times the individual national championship.
1 win in the 10000 m walk track (2011)
2 wins in the 20 km walk (2009, 2010)

See also
 Italy at the European Race Walking Cup - Multiple medalists
 Naturalized athletes of Italy

References

External links
 

1982 births
Living people
Italian male racewalkers
Athletics competitors of Fiamme Gialle
Athletes (track and field) at the 2008 Summer Olympics
Olympic athletes of Italy
Italian people of Republic of the Congo descent
Italian people of Haitian descent
Italian sportspeople of African descent
Athletes from Rome
Naturalised citizens of Italy
World Athletics Championships athletes for Italy